Jackson, Wisconsin may refer to:
Jackson County, Wisconsin
Jackson, Adams County, Wisconsin, a town
Jackson, Burnett County, Wisconsin, a town
Jackson, Washington County, Wisconsin, a town 
Jackson (village), Wisconsin, in Washington County

See also 
Jackson (disambiguation)